Media coverage of the Arab–Israeli conflict by journalists in international news media has been said to be biased by both sides and independent observers. These perceptions of bias, possibly exacerbated by the hostile media effect, have generated more complaints of partisan reporting than any other news topic and have led to a proliferation of media watchdog groups.

Types of bias

The language of conflict
Diction, or word choice, affects the interpretation of the same set of entities or events. There is an emotional and semantic difference between the verbs died and killed, and similarly between kill and murder; murder evokes stronger negative emotions and connotes intent. In the context of the Israeli–Palestinian conflict, various terminological issues arise. The terms "disputed territories" versus "occupied territories" reflect different positions on the legal status of the West Bank and Gaza Strip. The terms "security fence" and "apartheid wall," "neighbourhood" and "settlement," and "militant," "freedom fighter," and "terrorist," while used to describe the same entities, present them in a different light and suggest a different narrative. Similarly, describing an attack or bombing as a "response" or "retaliation" again places the events in a different light.

In the immediate aftermath of the Six-Day War Israeli usage initially adopted the standard terminology of referring to the West Bank and Gaza as "occupied territories" (ha-šeṭaḥim ha-kevušim). This was soon replaced by "administered territories" (ha-šeṭaḥim ha-muḥzaqim). Finally, the West Bank area, excluding East Jerusalem, was renamed "Judea and Samaria" (Yehudah we-Šomron), a term chosen to affirm the Biblical basis for the Jewish people's connection to that territory. While the default term in international law is belligerent occupation,  over subsequent decades, U.S. media coverage, which initially described Israel's presence in either of the Palestinian territories as an "occupation", gradually dropped the word and by 2001 it had become "almost taboo" in, and "ethereal in its absence" from, American reportage. A poll of British newsreaders that same year found that only 9% were aware that Israel was the occupying power of Palestinian territories. Israeli academic surveys at the time of Operation Defensive Shield (2002) also found that the Israeli public thought the West Bank revolt was evidence that Palestinians were trying, murderously, to wrest control of territories within Israel itself.

Several studies have concluded that "terminology bias" has been a recurrent feature of coverage of the conflict, and scholars and commentators like Yasir Suleiman and Peter Beinart argue that language manipulation plays an important role in endeavours to win over the international public, with some concluding that Israel has proven more adept in this battle. So too Greg Myre wrote of the rise of a "verbal arms race" where "(m)uch of the Mideast conflict is about winning international support", one which escalated with the onset of the Al-Aqsa Intifada. Brian Whitaker, reviewing 1,659 articles covering events in the Guardian and Evening Standard for this period (2000–2001), observed the same effects, adding that omission of important adjectives was notable: 66% failed to mention that the incidents took place in an occupied territory. Hebron was described as a divided city, though 99% of its inhabitants are Palestinian, whereas Israel describes Jerusalem as "undivided" though a third of its inhabitants are Palestinian. Likewise, Jews live in "communities", Palestinians in "areas".  In his view Israel had won the verbal war. East Jerusalem is not "occupied" or a cultural and spiritual centre for Muslims and Arabs for 14 centuries, but "the eternal, indivisible capital of Israel" and "reunited". In reporting the capture of Gilad Shalit on Israeli soil and his removal to the Gaza Strip, and Israel's response of detaining 60 Hamas members, half Palestinian West Bank parliamentarians, the former was said to have been kidnapped while the latter, seized from their beds in night raids and removed to Israeli prisons, were arrested. Beinart's article suggested there was a pattern of Orwellian "linguistic fraud and a culture of euphemism" in the way AIPAC, for one, describes what takes place in the West Bank.

In Israeli newspaper reportage of violence, the IDF confirms, or says, while the Palestinians claim. The word "violence" itself connotes, according to Gershon Shafir, different events in Israeli and non-Israeli discourse: In the former, it is essentially dissociated from the 50 year long practice of occupying Palestinian lands and used to refer only to an intermittent recourse to military methods to contain episodic upsurges of hostile Palestinian resistance, a means employed when the security of an otherwise peaceful state is said to be at stake.  Thus, Israeli violence is restricted to responses to specific events like putting down the First and Second Intifadas, Israel's wars in Gaza and the Palestinian knifing attacks in 2015–2016, which were mainly the work of lone wolves.
Shafir argues to the contrary that the occupation "is best understood as ongoing, day-in and day-out coercion, and its injuries include material, psychological, social, and bodily harm". And, he further claims, it is the coercive techniques of the institutions of occupation deployed to enforce submission that produce the occasional eruptions of "military operations" and wars. Violence is omnipresent reality for Palestinians, on the other hand, and found in all facets of the occupation. Consequently, he concludes, the most intense suppression of uprisings and wars cannot be considered in isolation from the occupation regime as an everyday experience.

Such omissions and alterations in the terms used are cited as an example of the pervasive use of euphemisms or loaded terminology in reportage on the Israeli-Palestinian conflict, a problem which the International Press Institute thought sufficiently important by 2013 to issue a handbook to guide journalists through the semantic minefield. What Palestinians call "assassinations" – the shooting of people suspected of terrorism – Israel first called "pre-emptive strikes", then "pinpoint preventive operations", and also "extrajudicial punishments" or "long-range hot pursuit" until "focused prevention" was finally settled on. Offers to return "occupied territory" are "(painful) concessions" rather than a compliance with international law. For decades, Israeli announcements, speaking of arrests of children, never used the word "child". Even a 10-year-old shot by the IDF could be referred to as "a young man of ten." The use of the term "colonialism" by New Historians to describe Zionist settlement, a term likening the process to the French colonization of Algeria  and the Dutch settlement of South Africa, has likewise been challenged, with some asserting that this is a demonizing term used in Palestinian textbooks. In the immediate aftermath of the 2021 Israeli-Palestinian conflict, Associated Press reporter Emily Wilder was fired because of tweets made during the conflict, after right-wing media sources complained of her pro-Palestinian views.  
Robert Fisk argues that the descriptive language used by major political players and the press to describe the occupation is one of "desemanticization": occupied lands become "disputed territories"; colonies are described as "settlements", "neighbourhoods" "suburbs", "population centres"; dispossession and exile are referred to as "dislocation"/"displacement"; Israelis are shot by "terrorists" but when Palestinians are shot dead they die in "clashes"; the Wall becomes a "fence" or "security barrier". Suicide bombers for Palestinians are "martyrs" (shahid); Israel prefers "homicide bombers".   Israel calls one of its uses of Palestinians as human shields a "neighbour procedure". If children are killed by Israeli fire, these events are often contextualized by the "shop-worn euphemism" (Fisk) of their being "caught in the crossfire". Deporting West Bankers to Gaza as collective punishment for families who have siblings that participated in terror incidents is known as an "order limiting the place of residency". Israeli military actions are customarily referred to as "responses" or "retaliations" to a Palestinian attack, even if it is Israel that strikes first.

Media and academic coverage

The quality of both Media coverage of the Arab–Israeli conflict and research and debates on university campuses have been the object of extensive monitoring and research.Public discussion of the occupation is also contested, especially on university campuses. Pro-Israeli Jewish students complain that they have been vilified or harassed; some proposed talks on Palestinian perspectives have been cancelled on the grounds that audiences might not be able to objectively evaluate the material. In response to attempts to silence several high-profile critics of Israeli territorial policies concerns have been expressed that the topic itself is at risk, and that the political pressures restricting research and discussion undermine academic freedom. In the latter regard, organizations like Campus Watch closely report and denounce what they consider "anti-Israeli" attitudes. In addition to Israel's hasbara organization, intent on countering negative press images, there are also many private pro-Israeli organizations, among them CAMERA, FLAME, HonestReporting, Palestinian Media Watch and the Anti-Defamation League which subject reportage to scrutiny in the belief news on Israel has systematically distorted reality to privilege Palestinian versions. In Ehud Barak's view Palestinians are "products of a culture in which to tell a lie..creates no dissonance".  Others allow that both sides lie, but "Arabs" are better at it.  The term Pallywood was coined to suggest that Palestinian coverage of their plight, in a genre called "traumatic realism", is marked by a diffuse intent to fraudulently manipulate the media, beginning with the killing of Mohammad Durrah, and, it has been argued, still being evoked as late as 2014 to dismiss Israeli responsibility for the Beitunia killings. The idea has been dismissed as bearing the hallmarks of a "conspiracy theory". On the other hand, book-length studies have been devoted to testing the theory that the world's understanding of the conflict, though "mediated by Israeli newspapers to a domestic audience", is "anti-Israel".Attempts have been made to silence several high-profile critics of Israeli policies in the territories, among them Tony Judt, Norman Finkelstein, Joseph Massad, Nadia Abu El-Haj and William I. Robinson. Such difficulties have given rise to anxieties that the topic itself is at risk, and that the political pressures circumscribing research and discussion undermine academic freedom itself.

Internal Israeli studies have argued that local press coverage has traditionally been conservative, reflecting the often tendentious and biased views of the political and military establishment, and similar tendencies have been noted in Palestinian reportage. In a sample of 48 reports of 22 Palestinian deaths, 40 Israeli accounts only gave the IDF version, a mere 8 included a Palestinian reaction. Tamar Liebes, former director of the Smart Institute of Communication at the Hebrew University, argued that Israeli "Journalists and publishers see themselves as actors within the Zionist movement, not as critical outsiders". The explosive expansion of the Internet has opened up a larger sphere of controversy. Digital forensics flourishing on social networks have occasionally revealed problems with a few widely circulating images of dead Palestinians, but, according to Kuntzman and Stein, technical suspicion quickly yielded ground, among Israeli Jewish social media practitioners who combined a politics of militant nationalism with global networking conventions, to unfounded polemical claims, making out that, 'the fraudulent, deceiving Palestinian was a "natural condition" that required no substantiation', and that, generically, images of dead or injured Palestinians were faked.Palestinians commonly use the phrases "gang of settlers" or "herd of settlers" to refer to Israeli settlers, expressions perceived as offensive and dehumanising because "gang" implies thuggish criminality (though some Palestinians view settlers as criminals) and "herd" uses animal imagery to refer to people. A former vice president of the Jewish Council for Public Affairs in the United States has remarked that many rabbis themselves address their congregations by tiptoeing around the topic of Israel and Palestine, and that there is a widespread fear that speaking forthrightly will make their community life and careers insecure.

John Mearsheimer and Stephen Walt have argued that "the American media's coverage of Israel tends to be strongly biased in Israel's favour"  compared to reportage in other democratic countries'  media, with a tendency to marginalize anyone who voices a critical attitude.  A 2001 study concluded that press coverage had highlighted violent displays and demonstrations of Palestinian grievances as if it were Palestinians who "looked for a confrontation", but consistently failed to add any context of the systematic abuses to which they are subjected. Marda Dunsky argues that empirical work appears to support Mearsheimer and Walt's claim. She concluded that coverage of (a) the refugee problem; (b) settlements; (c) the historical and political background, (which are either frequently skimmed over or entirely omitted), and (d) violence, "reflects the parameters of U.S. Middle East policy", regarding both U.S. aid and support for Israel. This view that American media are biased towards Palestinians has been challenged by authors who cite research that concluded most mainstream media have a "liberal" bias, a criticism extended to European outlets like Le Monde and the BBC.

Retaliation
A study by the American organization Fairness and Accuracy in Reporting monitored the use of the term "retaliation" in the nightly news broadcasts of the three main American networks CBS, ABC, and NBC between September 2000 through March 17, 2002. It found that of the 150 occasions when "retaliate" and its variants were used to describe attacks in the Israeli/Palestinian conflict, 79 percent were references to Israel "retaliating" and only 9 percent were references to Palestinians "retaliating".

Emotive language

In a study of BBC television news coverage, the Glasgow Media Group documented differences in the language used by journalists for Israelis and Palestinians. The study found that terms such as "atrocity," "brutal murder," "mass murder," "savage cold blooded killing," "lynching" and "slaughter" were used to describe the death of Israelis but not the death of Palestinians. The word "terrorist" was often used to describe Palestinians. However, in reports of an Israeli group attempting to bomb a Palestinian school, members of the Israeli group were referred to as "extremists" or "vigilantes" but not as "terrorists."

Omission
In the context of media, an omission refers to the failure to include information. This selective inclusion of information, which results from omitting other information, may distort the presentation of events in favor of one side or the other. In the context of the Israeli–Palestinian conflict, for example, consider the difference in overall impact between:
An article mentioning both a Palestinian suicide bombing in Israel and an Israeli offensive in the West Bank
An article mentioning only the Palestinian suicide bombing
An article mentioning only the Israeli offensive

In a 2001 study done by FAIR, only 4% of the US media mentioned that an occupation by Israel is occurring. In an update to the study, the number has reportedly gone down to only 2% of the media mentioning an occupation. The 2001 figure is also seen in the documentary Peace, Propaganda and the Promised Land.

Committee for Accuracy in Middle East Reporting in America (CAMERA) (a pro-Israel group) notes that factual errors can be errors of omission, where something important was not said, resulting in readers being misled, or commission, where information used is not true. Honest Reporting have asked the following questions : "was the reporting one-sided and imbalanced?";and "was key information missing (selective omission)?"

Palestine Media Watch in its "Media critique quick sheet" asked the following questions: "how many times were UN reports/findings/resolutions mentioned?"; "How many times were Human Rights reports/findings/statements mentioned?"; "did the story describe official Palestinian denials/pleas of ignorance and innocence in violent acts?" and "did the story describe official Israelis denials/pleas of ignorance and innocence in violent acts?"

Lack of verification

The ethics and standards of journalism require journalists to verify the factual accuracy of the information they report.  Factual verification" is what separates journalism from other modes of communication, such as propaganda, fiction or entertainment". Lack of verification involves the publication of potentially unreliable information prior to or without independent confirmation of the facts, and has resulted in various scandals. In the context of the Israel-Palestinian conflict, for example, consider:
The Battle of Jenin, after which early media reports claimed that Israel "massacred" hundreds of Palestinian civilians. Later investigations by the United Nations and Human Rights Watch estimated the total Palestinian death toll at 52 (with estimates of civilian deaths ranging from 22 to 26) and contradicted previous claims that a massacre had taken place.
The Islamic Jihad shooting attack on Kiryat Arba in November 2002, which Western media reports described as an attack on "worshipers," resulting in international condemnations. According to the Jerusalem Post, Islamic Jihad "opened fire at a [sic] security forces safeguarding Jewish worshipers," and according to both Haaretz and the Jerusalem Post, the twelve Israelis killed all belonged to the IDF, the Israeli Border Police, or the Hebron security force.

Honest Reporting (a pro-Israel group) believe that many media outlets devoted huge amounts of ink to "unverified Palestinian tales of conspiracies, mass murders, common graves, and war crimes."
CAMERA believe that when dealing with vilification of Israel, facts remain unchecked, accusations remain unverified, and journalistic responsibility is replaced by disclaimers.

Selective reporting

Selective reporting involves devoting more resources, such as news articles or air time, to the coverage of one side of the story over another. Honest Reporting has asked whether "equal time" was granted to both sides of the conflict, or was one side given preferential treatment – hence lending more weight and credibility to that side's positions.

In the context of the Israeli–Palestinian conflict, FAIR believe the media in the United States downplay violence against Palestinians and stated that National Public Radio reported more Israeli casualties of the Arab–Israeli conflict than Palestinian casualties by percentage. CAMERA made the opposite complaint – that NPR gave pro-Arab speakers 77% more time than Israeli or pro-Israeli speakers, and segments that included only pro-Arab speakers were almost twice as numerous and four times as long as those that omitted Arab speakers altogether.

Decontextualization
Decontextualization is a type of omission in which the omitted information is essential to understanding a decision, action, or event, its underlying motivations or key events leading up to it. In the context of the Israeli–Palestinian conflict, for example, consider the effect of the following:
 An article discussing the West Bank Barrier which does not mention the suicide bombings of the Second Intifada
 An article discussing the 2006 Hamas Election Victory which does not mention the corruption of Fatah

Honest Reporting believe that failing to provide proper context and full background information, journalists can dramatically distort the true picture. CAMERA believes it to be a frequent problem when reporting about the Middle East.

Reasons for bias

Print and broadcast media may be biased for varying reasons, including:

Coercion or censorship

Coercion or censorship refers to the use of intimidation or force to promote favorable reports and to confiscate unfavorable reports. In the Israeli–Palestinian conflict, both sides accuse each other of coercion or censorship as an explanation of alleged bias in favor of the other side. In support of these claims, Israeli advocates point to kidnappings of foreign reporters by Palestinians, while Palestinian advocates point to media blackouts and confiscation of reports by Israelis. Additionally, both sides point to reports by both governmental and non-governmental organizations, which assess the degree of journalistic freedom in the region. See Media of Israel and Human rights in Israel#Freedom of speech and the media.

Forgery or falsification

Forgery or falsification involves the intentional misrepresentation, alteration, or invention of reported information. Due to the severity of these actions, which violate the ethics and standards of journalism, instances of forgery and/or falsification are frequently cited by Israelis and their advocates and/or by Palestinians and their advocates—depending on the nature of the forgery and/or falsification—to support claims that the media favors the other side.
HonestReporting commented on the 2006 Lebanon War photographs controversies that "A Reuters photo turns out to be an outright lie, manipulated to make damage in Beirut appear much worse than reality." For additional claims see Pallywood

Placement

According to CAMERA,

headlines are the first, and sometimes only, news items seen by readers and should provide the accurate and specific essence of a news story. It criticized The New York Times for the placement of news stories about the Israeli–Palestinian conflict, focusing heavily on Palestinian suffering while continually minimizing the personal toll on Israelis.

Exaggeration or sensationalism
Sensationalism, in general, is a form of being extremely controversial, loud, or attention grabbing. In the context of the media, sensationalism refers to claims that the media chooses to report on shocking events or to exaggerate, at the expense of accuracy and objectivity, to improve viewer, listener or readership ratings. This criticism, also known as media circus, is proffered by both Israelis and Palestinians as a possible explanation for alleged bias.

HonestReporting believes a new de facto "stylebook" is being used by the media which sensationalize the intensity and scope of Israeli military actions. the following regarding sensationalism: CAMERA criticized Haaretz for using a sensational headline:

Prejudiced journalists
Journalists may intentionally or unintentionally distort reports due to political ideology, national affiliation, antisemitism, anti-Arabism, or Islamophobia.

Richard Falk, United Nations special rapporteur on Palestinian human rights, has stated that in the media-distorted picture surrounding the Middle East, those who reports honestly and factually are accused of bias, whereas pro-Israel bias is perceived as mainstream. Falk has stated that because the media don't adequately report violations of international law by Israel, "the American public isn't aware of the behavior of Israel or the victimization of the Palestinian people. This creates a kind of imbalance."
CAMERA attributed Christiane Amanpour's allegedly biased news coverage to her political ideology; Ira Stoll of the New York Sun, and formerly of the Jerusalem Post, attributes alleged anti-Israel media bias in part to reporters of Jewish background.

Contentious incidents

To substantiate claims that the media favors the other side, participants in the conflict on each side frequently cite a number of illustrative and extreme examples of controversial reporting. This section lists incidents of controversial reporting frequently cited by only Israelis and Israel advocates, by only Palestinians and Palestinian advocates, or by both sides. The list of incidents appear chronologically, according to when the incident took place. Where events took place on the same date, the incidents appear sorted alphabetically.

Muhammad al-Durrah affair

On September 30, 2000, the 11- to 12-year-old boy, Muhammad al-Durrah, was shot in Palestinian-Israeli crossfire at the Netzarim junction. France 2, which caught the incident on tape, claimed that Israel had fatally shot the boy. After an official, internal investigation, the IDF conceded that it was probably responsible and apologized for the shooting. Al-Durrah became a symbol of the Second Intifada and of Palestinian martyrdom.

External investigations suggested that the IDF could not have shot the boy and that the tape had been staged. In 2001, following a non-military investigation, conducted by Israeli Southern Command Maj.-Gen. Yom Tov Samia, the Israeli Prime Minister's Foreign Media Advisor, Dr. Ra'anan Gissin, along with Daniel Seaman of the Israeli Government Press Office (GPO) publicly challenged the accuracy of the France 2 report. In 2005, the head of the Israeli National Security Agency, Major-General (res.) Giora Eiland publicly retracted the IDF's initial admittance of responsibility. To avoid negative publicity and a resulting backlash, the IDF did not conduct its own official, military investigation until 2007. On October 1, 2007, Israel officially denied responsibility for the shooting and claimed that the France 2 footage had been staged, prompting criticism from Al-Durrah's father.

However, in early 2012, Dr. David Yehudah was sued by al-Dura's father and was acquitted in French court.

The French defamation case was definitely settled on June 26, 2013, by the French Court of Appeals: Philippe Karsenty was convicted of defamation and fined €7,000 by the Paris Court of Appeals. Karsenty's version, which described the killing of young Mohammed Al Durah as "staged", was rejected by the French Court's final decision.

Photo of Tuvia Grossman

On September 30, 2000, The New York Times, the Associated Press, and other media outlets published a photograph of a club-wielding Israeli police officer standing over a battered and bleeding young man. The photograph's caption identified the young man as a Palestinian and the location as the Temple Mount. The young man in the picture was 20-year-old Tuvia Grossman, a Jewish American student from Chicago who had been studying at a Yeshiva in Israel; the Israeli police officer in the photograph, actually came to his rescue by threatening his Palestinian assailants.

After a complaint by Grossman's father, The New York Times issued a correction on October 4. A few days later the Times published an article about the incident and printed a more complete correction. The Times attributed the error to a misidentification by the Israeli agency that took the photo compounded by a further misidentification by the Associated Press "which had received many pictures of injured Palestinians that day".

The Grossman photo appears frequently in Israeli criticisms of the media, because the photograph implied that the police officer who rescued Grossman had beaten him, it implied an Israeli perpetrator, it implied a Palestinian victim, and it conveyed the opposite of what had transpired. Seth Ackerman of FAIR described the attention given to the photo, as well as the two NYT corrections, as disproportionate to a "plausible, though careless" assumption resulting from "garbled information from the Israeli photographer".

Battle of Jenin
On April 3, 2002, following the Passover massacre on March 27 which killed 30 Israeli civilians and wounded as many as 143, the IDF began a major military operation in the Jenin refugee camp, a city which, according to Israel, had "served as a launching site for numerous terrorist attacks against both Israeli civilians and Israeli towns and villages in the area". The fighting, which lasted eight days and resulted in the deaths of 52 Palestinians (including 14 civilians, according to the IDF, and 22 civilians, according to HRW) and 23 Israeli soldiers, has been interpreted quite differently by Israelis and Palestinians. In the aftermath of the fighting, chief Palestinian negotiator Saeb Erekat claimed that the IDF had killed 500 Palestinians and accused Israel of committing a "massacre". Early news publications, following both IDF estimates of 200 Palestinians killed and Palestinian estimates of 500 Palestinians killed, reported hundreds of Palestinian deaths and repeated claims that a massacre had taken place. Human Rights Watch and Amnesty International later found that no massacre had taken place, although both organizations charged the IDF with war crimes and human rights violations. The United Nations similarly dismissed claims that hundreds of Palestinians had been killed as unsubstantiated, a finding which was widely interpreted and reported as rejecting claims of a "massacre".

Israelis cite the reporting surrounding the Battle of Jenin, because "the Arab and European media hastily reported", without proper verification, Palestinian allegations that a massacre had taken place, a claim broken by Amnesty International and Human Rights Watch, and described by many pro-Israel sources as "The Big Jenin Lie" and by HonestReporting as "Jeningrad".

Gaza beach blast

On June 9, 2006, an explosion on a beach in the Gaza Strip killed seven Palestinians, including three children. Palestinian sources claimed that the explosion resulted from Israeli shelling. After a three-day investigation, Israel concluded that the blast could not have resulted from an IDF artillery shell. This IDF investigation was criticized by both Human Rights Watch and The Guardian for ignoring evidence. The IDF agreed that the report should have mentioned two gunboat shells fired at about the time of the deaths but stated that these shells had landed too far away from the area to be the cause of the explosion and this omission did not impact the report's overall conclusion that Israel had not been responsible for the blast. According to Human Rights Watch, the IDF acknowledged that the cause of the blast may have been an unexploded 155mm artillery shell from an earlier shelling, or another location, but suggested it might have been placed there as an IED by Palestinians.

An investigation by Human Rights Watch concluded that the explosion was caused by a 155mm Israeli artillery shell, stating that 'The shrapnel, crater, and injuries all point to this weapon as the cause.' According to CAMERA, "many in the press [have presumed] that Israel is responsible". This incident is often cited by Israel advocates who claim that the media favors the Palestinian side, because of reports which attributed the blast to the IDF prior to the conclusion of the IDF investigation.

2006 Lebanon War photographs controversies

On August 5, 2006 Charles Foster Johnson of Little Green Footballs accused Reuters of inappropriately manipulating images of destruction to Beirut caused by Israel during the Second Lebanon War. This accusation marked the first of many accusations against media outlets for inappropriate photo manipulation. Media outlets were also accused of incorrectly captioning photos and of staging photographs through the inappropriate use of props. These accusations, which initially appeared in the blogosphere, were amplified by Aish HaTorah through an online video entitled "Photo Fraud in Lebanon". In response to these allegations, Reuters toughened its photo editing policy and admitted to inappropriate photo manipulation on the part of Adnan Hajj, a freelance photographer whom Reuters subsequently fired. Additionally, BBC, The New York Times, and the Associated Press recalled photos or corrected captions in response to some of the accusations. This journalistic scandal, dubbed "Reutersgate" by the blogosphere in reference to the Watergate scandal and dubbed  "fauxtography" by Honest Reporting and others, is frequently cited by Israelis and by Israel advocates to demonstrate alleged anti-Israel bias, this time in the form of an outright forgery created by a biased local freelance photographer.

"Mystery of Israel's Secret Uranium Bomb"
On October 28, 2006, The Independent published an article, by Robert Fisk, which speculated, based on information from the European Committee on Radiation Risk, that Israel may have used depleted uranium weapons during the 2006 Lebanon War. The article prompted criticism by HonestReporting for coming to conclusions prematurely, and resulted in an investigation by the United Nations Environment Programme (UNEP). On November 8, 2006, UNEP concluded that Israel had not used any form of uranium-based weapons. Israelis and Israel advocates cite the article as an instance of "shoddy journalism", arising allegedly as a result of media sensationalism.

Samir Kuntar as a hero
On July 19, 2008, Al Jazeera TV broadcast a program from Lebanon that covered the "welcome-home" festivities for Samir Kuntar, a Lebanese militant who had been imprisoned in Israel for murdering several people, including a four-year-old child, in a Palestine Liberation Front raid from Lebanon into Israel. In the program, the head of Al Jazeera's Beirut office, Ghassan bin Jiddo, praised Kuntar as a "pan-Arab hero" and organized a birthday party for him. In response, Israel's Government Press Office (GPO) threatened to boycott the satellite channel unless it apologized. A few days later an official letter was issued by Al Jazeera's director general, Wadah Khanfar, in which he admitted that the program violated the station's Code of Ethics and that he had ordered the channel's programming director to take steps to ensure that such an incident does not recur.

Baby death date misrepresentation
A Gaza man falsely claimed that his five-month-old baby died on March 23, 2012, when the generator powering his respirator ran out of fuel, a result of the Egyptian blockade on Gaza and Egyptian cut-off of fuel to Gaza. The baby's death, which had been "confirmed" by a Gaza health official, would have been the first to be connected with the territory's energy shortage. The baby's father, Abdul-Halim Helou, said that his son Mohammed was born with a lymphatic disorder and needed removal of the fluids that accumulated in his respiratory system, and had only a few months to live. He said that they had erred in how much fuel was required and that if they had been "living in a normal country with electricity", his son's chances of living longer would have been better.

However, the report was called into question when it emerged that the timing of the baby's death had been misrepresented, and appeared to be an attempt by Gaza's Hamas rulers to exploit the death to gain sympathy. The Associated Press later learned that news of Mohammed Helou's death had already appeared on March 4 in the local Arabic newspaper Al-Quds and that Hamas was now trying to recycle the story to capitalize on the family's tragedy. The Al-Quds article contained the same details as the later report, but with an earlier date. When confronted by the Associated Press, the family and Hamas official Bassem al-Qadri continued to insist that the baby had only recently died. The AP reporter Diaa Hadid tweeted, "#Hamas misrepresented a story. Two Hamas officials misled us and so did the family."

The Associated Press then retracted the story, explaining that "The report has been called into question after it was learned that a local newspaper carried news of the baby's death on March 4."

An Israeli government spokesman said he was not surprised by Hamas' attempt to "hide the truth and manipulate the information that is allowed to get out of Gaza."

Honest Reporting commented that "when Palestinian lies and misinformation go unchecked, it's inevitable that dishonest propaganda tactics used against Israel will be employed against others." CAMERA stated that this was "the latest example of disinformation about Gaza casualties."

Gaza floods caused by opening dams in Israel

Gaza is a coastal plain, bordering the Negev desert which witnesses flash floods during heavy rains as water runs across the surface of the impervious desert soil. During the 2013 winter storm in the Middle east Ma'an News Agency reported that Israel opened dams, leading to Gaza floods. However, no such dams actually exist.

Gazan paramedic killed by the Israeli army 

Razan Ashraf Abdul Qadir al-Najjar was a nurse/paramedic who was killed by the Israeli army while volunteering as a medic during the 2018 Gaza border protests. She was fatally shot in the chest by an Israeli soldier as she, reportedly with her arms raised to show she was unarmed, tried to help evacuate the wounded near Israel's border fence with Gaza.

The Israeli army released footage in which she purportedly admitted to participating in the protests as a human shield, supposedly at the request of Hamas. The video was later found to be a clip from an interview with a Lebanese television station that had been edited by the IDF to misleadingly take al-Najjar's comments out of context. In the actual, unedited video, she made no mention of Hamas, and called herself a "rescuing human shield to protect and save the wounded at the front lines", with everything following "human shield" trimmed out of the Israeli clip. The IDF was widely criticized for tampering with the video to chip away at her image.

Films
This section discusses films with media coverage of the Arab-Israeli conflict as its main topic. The films presented in this section appear in alphabetical order.

Décryptage

Décryptage is a 2003 documentary written by Jacques Tarnero and directed by Philippe Bensoussan. The French film (with English subtitles) examines media coverage of the Arab–Israeli conflict in French media, and claims that the media's presentation of the Israeli–Palestinian conflict in France is consistently skewed against Israel and may be responsible for exacerbating anti-Semitism.

Pallywood

Pallywood: According to Palestinian sources... is an 18-minute online documentary by Richard Landes. The film, with its title derived from the words Palestine and Hollywood, claims that the Western media uncritically accepts and reports the stories of freelance Palestinian videographers who record staged scenes, often involving faked or exaggerated injuries, to elicit sympathy and support.

Peace, Propaganda, and the Promised Land

Peace, Propaganda, and the Promised Land is a 2004 documentary by Sut Jhally and Bathsheba Ratzkoff. The movie claims that the influence of pro-Israel media watchdog groups, such as CAMERA and Honest Reporting, leads to distorted and pro-Israel media reports. In its response to the movie, the pro-Israel JCRC criticizes the film for not discussing the influence of "the numerous pro‐Palestinian media watchdog groups, including, ironically, FAIR (Fair and Accuracy in the Media, which describes itself as 'A National Media Watch Group'), whose spokesperson played a prominent role in the film". According to the pro-Palestinian LiP Magazine, the movie "offers a great starting point for thinking about media misrepresentation of the Israel-Palestinian conflict, and useful analysis of how language is used to manipulate public opinion," but is short on "solid statistics and facts to back up some of its blanket statements". A review in The New York Times by Ned Martel found that the film "largely ignores Palestinian leadership, which has surely played a part in the conflict's broken vows and broken hearts. And such a lack of dispassion weakens the one-sided film's bold and detailed argument".

Other criticisms
 False compromise

False compromise refers to the claim, made by some Israeli advocates and by some Palestinian advocates, that their side of the conflict is morally right and the other side is morally wrong and, therefore, attempts to balance the presentation of both viewpoints wrongfully suggests that both sides are morally equivalent.  In the words of journalist Bret Stephens, "Moral clarity is a term that doesn't get much traction these days, least of all among journalists, who prefer 'objectivity' and 'balance.' Yet good journalism is more than about separating fact from opinion and being fair. Good journalism is about fine analysis and making distinctions, and this applies as much to moral distinctions as to any others. Because too many reporters today refuse to make moral distinctions, we are left with a journalism whose narrative and analytical failings have become ever more glaring".
 Structural geographic bias

Structural geographic bias refers to the claim, made by some Palestinian advocates, that the Western media favors Israel, allegedly as a result of Western reporters living in Israel.

Internet and social media

Advocacy groups, governments and individuals use the internet, new media and social media to try to influence public perceptions of both sides in the Arab/Palestinian–Israeli conflict. Jerusalem Post writer Megan Jacobs has written "War in the Middle East is being waged not only on the ground, but also in cyberspace." While Israeli and Palestinian advocacy websites promote their respective points of view, fierce debate over the Arab–Israeli conflict has embroiled social networking websites and applications with user-generated content, such as Facebook, Google Earth, Twitter and Wikipedia. According to an Associated Press article, Israelis and Palestinians make use of social media to promote "rival narratives" and draw attention to their own suffering to gain international sympathy and backing. However, "distortions and mistakes are instantly magnified on a global scale."

Facebook
Facebook is a social networking website, which allows users to connect and interact with other people online, both directly by "friending" people and indirectly through the creation of groups. Because the website allows users to join networks organized by city, workplace, school, and region, Facebook has become embroiled in a number of regional conflicts. Facebook groups such as "'Palestine' Is not a country... De-list it from Facebook as a country!" and "Israel is not a country! ... Delist it from Facebook as a country!", among others reflecting the mutual non-recognition of the Israeli–Palestinian conflict, have protested Facebook's listing of Israel and Palestine, respectively, as countries. This controversy became particularly heated when, in response to protests over Palestine being listed as a country, Facebook delisted it. The move infuriated Palestinian users and prompted the creation of numerous Facebook groups such as "The Official Petition to get Palestine listed as a Country", "Against delisting Palestine from Facebook", and "If Palestine is removed from Facebook ... I'm closing my account". Facebook, in response to user complaints, ultimately reinstated Palestine as a country network. A similar controversy took place regarding the status of Israeli settlements. When Israeli settlements were moved from being listed under the Israel network to the Palestine network, thousands of Israelis living in the area protested Facebook's decision. In response to the protest, Facebook has allowed users living in the area to select either Israel or Palestine as their home country.

Another controversy over Facebook regarding the Arab-Israeli conflict concerns Facebook groups which, against Facebook's terms of use, promote hatred and violence. According to former Israeli Prime Minister Shimon Peres, Facebook has been used to promote anti-Semitism and anti-Zionism. A proliferation of Facebook groups praising the perpetrator of the Mercaz HaRav massacre in 2008 prompted the creation of the Facebook group "FACEBOOK: Why do you support Anti-Semitism and Islamic Terrorism", which claimed to have succeeded in deleting over 100 pro-Palestinian Facebook groups with violent content, by reporting the groups to Facebook. The group, which since evolved into the Jewish Internet Defense Force, took over the Facebook group "Israel is not a country! Delist it from Facebook as a country" when, according to the JIDF, Facebook stopped removing such groups. After taking over the group, the JIDF began to remove its more than 48,000 members and replaced the group's graphic with a picture of an IAF jet with the flag of Israel in the background. This sparked controversy.

Twitter
According to a McClatchy news article, those using social media, including even official spokesmen and public officials, have a habit of "re-purposing" older photographs and videos to illustrate current-day events. Few people check the accuracy of the material before spreading it to others. During the March 2012 Gaza–Israel clashes there were three such notable Twitter incidents. Ofir Gendelman, a spokesman for Israeli Prime Minister Benjamin Netanyahu, tweeted a photo of an Israeli woman and her two children ducking a Gaza rocket describing it as "when a rocket fired by terrorists from Gaza is about to hit their home." When it was proved the photo was from 2009 he said "I never stated that the photo was current. It illustrates the fear that people in southern Israel live in." Avital Leibovich, the head of the foreign desk for Israel's military, sent a tweet from her official account of a video of rockets from Gaza being fired at Israel. It later was discovered the video had been taken in October 2011. When questioned she said her tweet was not misleading and "Launching a rocket does not differ whether it happened in November, July or now".

Leibovich was one of a number of bloggers who criticized Khulood Badawi, an Information and Media Coordinator for the United Nations Office for the Coordination of Humanitarian Affairs who tweeted a picture of a Palestinian child covered in blood. She captioned it "Another child killed by #Israel... Another father carrying his child to a grave in #Gaza." It was discovered the picture was published in 2006 and was of a Palestinian girl who had died in an accident and been brought to the hospital shortly after an Israeli air strike in Gaza. Israel's Ambassador to the United Nations Ron Prosor called for Badawi's dismissal, stating that she was "directly engaged in spreading misinformation". Humanitarian Coordinator and the Head of Office in Jerusalem later met with officials at the Ministry of Foreign Affairs of Israel to discuss these events. UN Under-Secretary General Valerie Amos wrote, "It is regrettable that an OCHA staff member has posted information on her personal Twitter profile, which is both false and which reflects on issues that are related to her work."

A few days later Badawi tweeted on her personal account "Correction: I tweeted the photo believing it was from the last round of violence & it turned out to be from 2006 This is my personal account." Ma'an News Agency reported a week later that the hospital medical report on the dead girl stated that she died "due to falling from a high area during the Israeli strike on Gaza". There are differing accounts of how the Israeli air strike, reported to be as little as 100 meters away, may have caused the accident.

Wikipedia

Wikipedia is an online, collaboratively written encyclopedia. While editing conflicts occur frequently, one particular conflict, involving CAMERA and The Electronic Intifada, was reported in The Jerusalem Post and the International Herald Tribune (IHT). When CAMERA encouraged individuals sympathetic to Israel to participate in editing Wikipedia to "lead to more accuracy and fairness on Wikipedia", The Electronic Intifada accused CAMERA of "orchestrating a secret, long-term campaign to infiltrate the popular online encyclopedia Wikipedia to rewrite Palestinian history, pass off crude propaganda as fact, and take over Wikipedia administrative structures to ensure these changes go either undetected or unchallenged." The accusations led to administrative actions on Wikipedia—including the banning of certain editors. HonestReporting  responded to the incident with its own article, entitled "Exposed – Anti-Israeli Subversion on Wikipedia" which complained of "anti-Israel bias on Wikipedia" and described Wikipedia's NPOV policy as a "noble goal not always applied equally by Wikipedia users. CAMERA similarly responded to the incident with a letter entitled "The failure of Wikipedia", appearing in IHT, which described Wikipedia's Middle East articles as "often-unreliable". In a separate article entitled "The Wild West of Wikipedia", which appeared in The Jewish Chronicle and IMRA, Gilead Ini of CAMERA decried "Wikipedia's often-skewed entries about the Middle East", described Wikipedia's rules as "shoddily enforced", and wrote that, following the incident, "many editors who hoped to ensure accuracy and balance ... are now banned" while "partisan editors ... continue to freely manipulate Wikipedia articles to their liking".

The Yesha Council and Israel Sheli, launched a project to improve coverage of Zionist views on Wikipedia. The project organiser, Ayelet Shaked emphasized that the information has to be reliable and meet Wikipedia rules. "The idea is not to make Wikipedia rightist but for it to include our point of view," said Naftali Bennett, the director of the Yesha Council. In this vein, the groups taught a course on how to edit Wikipedia. The Yesha Council also launched a new prize, "Best Zionist Editor," to be awarded to the most productive editor on Israel-related topics.

In 2013, news outlets including Haaretz and France24 reported the indefinite block of an editor who had concealed the fact that he was an employee of right-wing media group NGO Monitor. The editor was reported to have edited English Wikipedia articles on the Israeli–Palestinian conflict "in an allegedly biased manner".

Watchdog groups
This is an alphabetically sorted list of media watchdog groups which monitor coverage of the conflict in Western news media. While academics debate the impact of the media on public opinion, lobbying organisations view the media as essential in influencing public perceptions of the conflict and, therefore, as paramount in influencing and securing favorable public policy in relation to the conflict.

See also
Israeli occupation of the West Bank
Media coverage of the 2014 Israel–Gaza conflict
Israeli Military Censor
Arab zoological conspiracy theories
Israel-related animal conspiracy theories
2006 Fox journalists kidnapping
Adnan Hajj photographs controversy
Hasbara
Jewish Internet Defense Force
James Miller
Fadel Shana'a
Deception: Betraying the Peace Process
Media of Israel

Notes

Citations

Sources

Further reading
Bad News from Israel, Greg Philo and Mike Berry Pluto Press, (2004)
Caught in the Middle by Steve Mcnally; Columbia Journalism Review, Vol. 40, January–February 2002
Covering Islam: How the Media and the Experts Determine How We See the Rest of the World, by Edward W. Said (1997)
Covering the Intifada: A Hazardous Beat; Photographers and Journalists Come under Gunfire While Reporting on the Conflict, by Joel Campagna; Nieman Reports, Vol. 56, Fall 2002
Covering the Intifada: How the Media Reported the Palestinian Uprising , by Joshua Muravchik; Washington Institute for Near East Policy, 2003 
Days of Rage: News Organizations Have Been Besieged by Outraged Critics Accusing Them of Unfair Coverage of the Violence in the Middle East. Are They Guilty as Charged?, by Sharyn Vane; American Journalism Review, Vol. 24, July–August 2002
Do Words and Pictures from the Middle East Matter? A Journalist from the Region Argues That U.S. Policy Is Not Affected by the Way News Is Reported, by Rami G. Khouri; Nieman Reports, Vol. 56, Fall 2002
Image and Reality of the Israel-Palestine Conflict, New and Revised Edition, by Norman G. Finkelstein (2003)
Images Lead to Varying Perceptions: 'In Photographs in Which We, as Journalists, Saw Danger, Some Readers Saw Deception, by Debbie Kornmiller; Nieman Reports, Vol. 56, Fall 2002
Israel-Palestine on Record: How the New York Times Misreports Conflict in the Middle East  by Richard A. Falk and Howard Friel London: Verso (2007)  .
The Israeli-Hezbollah War of 2006: The Media as a Weapon in Asymmetrical Conflict by Marvin Kalb John F. Kennedy School of Government, Harvard University, February 2007
 The Minefield of Language in Middle East Coverage: Journalists Rarely Have the Time or Space to Navigate through the War of Words, by Beverly Wall; Nieman Reports, Vol. 56, Fall 2002
Missing: The Bias Implicit in the Absent, by Marda Dunsky; Arab Studies Quarterly, Vol. 23, 2001
The Other War: A Debate: Questions of Balance in the Middle East by Adeel Hassan; Columbia Journalism Review, Vol. 42, May–June 2003
The Other War: Israelis, Palestinians and the Struggle for Media Supremacy, by Stephanie Gutmann, Encounter Books 2005
Pens and Swords: How the American Mainstream Media Report the Israeli-Palestinian Conflict, Marda Dunsky, Columbia University Press, 2008
Perceptions of Palestine: Their Influence on U.S. Middle East Policy, Kathleen Christison (2001)
Racism and the North American Media Following September 11: The Canadian Setting, by T. Y. Ismael and John Measor; Arab Studies Quarterly, Vol. 25, 2003
Reporting the Arab Israeli Conflict: How Hegemony Works by Tamar Liebes (1997)
Understanding the Arab-Israeli Conflict: What the Headlines Haven't Told You, by Michael Rydelnik; Moody Publishers (June 1, 2004)

External links
CNN Navigates Raw Emotions In Its Coverage From Israel by The New York Times
The Hottest Button: How The Times Covers Israel and Palestine by The New York Times
Some U.S. Backers of Israel Boycott Dailies Over Mideast Coverage That They Deplore by The New York Times
Journalists caught in the middle by the BBC
NUJ under fire for Israel boycott by The Guardian
Israel cuts links with BBC by The Guardian
Israel to boycott Al-Jazeera TV, claiming incitement to terror by Haaretz
Israel accuses al-Jazeera of bias by BBC
NPR reacts to charges of anti-Israel bias in coverage by JTA
Watching the Pro-Israeli Media Watchers by Manfred Gerstenfeld and Ben Green on JCPA
Seven Years on the Front Lines by Honest Reporting on YouTube
CAMERA 2007 by CAMERA on YouTube
Are There Two Sides to Every Story? by HonestReporting on YouTube

 
Arab–Israeli conflict
Media bias controversies
Mass media in the State of Palestine